A suicide pill (also known as the cyanide pill, kill-pill, lethal pill, death-pill, or L-pill) is a pill, capsule, ampoule, or tablet containing a fatally poisonous substance that a person ingests deliberately in order to achieve death quickly through suicide. Military and espionage organizations have provided their agents in danger of being captured by the enemy with suicide pills and devices which can be used in order to avoid an imminent and far more unpleasant death (such as through torture), or to ensure that they cannot be interrogated and forced to disclose secret information. As a result, lethal pills have important psychological value to persons carrying out missions with a high risk of capture and interrogation.

The term "poison pill" is also used colloquially for a policy or legal action set up by an institution that has fatal or highly unpleasant consequences for that institution if a certain event occurs. Examples are the poison pill shareholders rights amendments inserted in corporate charters as a takeover defence, and wrecking amendments added to legislative bills.

History

Description

During World War II, British and American secret services developed the "L-pill" (lethal pill) which was given to agents going behind enemy lines. It was an oval capsule, approximately the size of a pea, consisting of a thin-walled glass ampoule covered in brown rubber to protect against accidental breakage and filled with a concentrated solution of potassium cyanide. It could be carried in the mouth, shaped as a false tooth; if it was accidentally swallowed it would pass harmlessly through the body. To use, the agent bites down on the pill, crushing the ampoule to release the fast-acting poison. Heartbeat quickly stops and brain death occurs within minutes. 

After the war, the L-pill was offered to pilots of the U-2 reconnaissance plane, who were in danger of being shot down and captured flying over Eastern Europe, but most pilots declined to take it with them.

The Central Intelligence Agency began experimenting with saxitoxin, an extremely potent neurotoxin, during the 1950s as a replacement for the L-pill. According to CIA Director William Colby, a tiny saxitoxin-impregnated needle hidden inside a fake silver dollar was issued to Francis Gary Powers, an American U-2 pilot who was shot down while flying over the USSR in May 1960.

According to Former CIA Chief of Disguise Jonna Mendez, the CIA hid poison pills in a number of items, including the caps of pens, and the frames of glasses. Operatives would bite down, and the poison concealed inside would be released.

Examples
 One of the objectives of the Dieppe Raid in August 1942 was to discover the importance and performance capability of a German radar station on the cliff-top to the east of the French town of Pourville. To achieve this, RAF Flight Sergeant Jack Nissenthall, a radar specialist, was attached to the South Saskatchewan Regiment. He was to attempt to enter the radar station and learn its secrets, accompanied by a small unit of 11 men of the Saskatchewans as bodyguards. Nissenthall volunteered for the mission fully aware that, due to the highly sensitive nature of his knowledge of Allied radar technology, his Saskatchewan bodyguard unit was under orders to kill him if necessary to prevent his being captured. He also carried a cyanide pill as a last resort.
German field marshal Erwin Rommel was forced to commit suicide with a cyanide pill following his implication in the plot of July 20, 1944 against Hitler. 
 At the end of World War II, Hitler's wife Eva Braun and a number of leading Nazis, such as Heinrich Himmler and Philipp Bouhler died by suicide using lethal pills containing a solution of cyanide salts.
 In 1985, serial killer Leonard Lake died by suicide using cyanide pills sewn into his clothes after he was arrested for possessing a suppressor and an unregistered handgun, knowing that further investigation into his life would uncover his more serious crimes.
 In 1987, two North Korean agents bit into ampoules hidden in the filter tips of cigarettes after they were detained in Bahrain as suspects in an airplane bombing. One agent died.
 During the Sri Lankan Civil War between 1987 and 2009, the suicide bombers of the Tamil Tigers wore a potassium cyanide necklace. If they were captured by the Sri Lanka Army, they would bite into the tablet at the end of the necklace. In addition to suicide bombers, since 1976 almost all Tamil tigers of LTTE wore suicide pills. This is the most modern-day, wide-scale use of potassium cyanide as a suicide tool. The women were the most publicized, carrying a tablet adhered to their tooth.
 In 1977, Aleksandr Ogorodnik, a CIA Operative working in the USSR was captured by the KGB. He offered to write his confession, but said he would only do it with his pen- he bit down on the cap which had an ampoule of lethal poison concealed inside it. According to the Russian agent interrogating him, he was dead before he hit the floor.

Metaphorical uses

In economics, a suicide pill is a form of risk arbitrage used by corporations to suicide during hostile takeover attempts. As an extreme version of the poison pill defense, this crippling provision refers to any technique used by a target firm in which takeover protection could result in self-destruction.

Variations of the suicide pill include the Jonestown Defense, the Scorched Earth defense, and the golden parachute.

Space travel
One urban legend suggests that American astronauts could carry suicide pills in case they are unable to return to Earth. It is possible this myth was started by the movie Contact in a scene where the main character is given suicide pills in case she cannot get back to Earth. This was disputed by astronaut Jim Lovell, who co-wrote Lost Moon (later renamed Apollo 13). On the DVD director's commentary, it was asserted that because marooned astronauts could easily commit suicide by simply venting the air from their spacecraft or suits, such a pill would not likely be necessary.

Cosmonaut Alexei Leonov stated that the Soviet space program gave him a suicide pill for use if he could not reenter Voskhod 2 after his March 1965 spacewalk.

In popular culture
An episode of Extraordinary Attorney Woo depicted the head of a technology company publicly ingesting a cyanide pill in front of a courtroom to protest his company’s treatment by the legal system. He was promptly rushed to the hospital and did not die.

References

External links
 
  

Poisons
Suicide methods